In Your House 10: Mind Games was the 10th In Your House professional wrestling pay-per-view (PPV) event produced by the World Wrestling Federation (WWF, now WWE). The event took place on September 22, 1996, at the CoreStates Center in Philadelphia, Pennsylvania.  The PPV portion of the show featured six matches. There was also a match on the Free for All pre-show as well as three dark matches. With the launch of the WWE Network in 2014, this show became available on demand, but did not include the Free for All match.

The main event of the show saw Shawn Michaels defend the WWF World Heavyweight Championship against Mankind. Also on the show the WWF Tag Team Champions The Smoking Gunns (Billy Gunn and Bart Gunn) defended the championship against Owen Hart and The British Bulldog. On the undercard former Olympic Athlete Mark Henry made his professional wrestling debut.

Production

Background
In Your House was a series of monthly pay-per-view (PPV) shows first produced by the World Wrestling Federation (WWF, now WWE) in May 1995. They aired when the promotion was not holding one of its then-five major PPVs (WrestleMania, King of the Ring, SummerSlam, Survivor Series, and Royal Rumble), and were sold at a lower cost. In Your House 10: Mind Games took place on September 22, 1996, at the CoreStates Center in Philadelphia, Pennsylvania. The name of the show was based on the rivalry between Shawn Michaels and Mankind.

Storylines
In Your House 10: Mind Games featured professional wrestling matches involving different wrestlers from pre-existing scripted feuds, plots, and storylines that were played out on Monday Night Raw and other World Wrestling Federation (WWF) television programming. Wrestlers portrayed a heel (wrestling term for those that portray the "bad guys") or a face (those that portray the "good guys") as they followed a series of events that built tension, and culminated into a wrestling match or series of matches.

Event
During the Free For All pre show, Savio Vega defeated Marty Jannetty, only to be attacked by Justin Bradshaw after the match. The attack lead to the two facing off in the first match of the actual PPV, which was also Bradshaw's first PPV match. Savio Vega won the Caribbean Strap match between the two. During the match two wrestlers from the local Extreme Championship Wrestling (ECW) promotion, Tommy Dreamer and The Sandman were shown at ringside, getting involved in the match before being thrown out of the arena. This marked the beginning of the working relationship between the WWF and ECW. In his debut, Mark Henry forced Jerry Lawler to submit to a backbreaker, after which he was attacked by Marty Jannetty, Leif Cassidy, and Hunter Hearst-Helmsley. During the final moments of the main event, Vader came to ringside and attacked Shawn Michaels as he had Mankind covered for a pin to draw a disqualification. This brought out Sycho Sid to chase Vader off. Subsequently The Undertaker, Mankind's rival, appeared from a coffin at ringside and attacked Mankind after the match was over, this was The Stalker's in-ring debut match but did not happen for unknown reasons.

Results

Other on-screen personnel

References

10: Mind Games
Events in Philadelphia
1996 in Pennsylvania
Professional wrestling in Philadelphia
1996 WWF pay-per-view events
September 1996 events in the United States